Harriet Naa Akleh Okanteh known as Auntie B or Auntie Bee is Ghanaian actress who is known for her roles in Efiewura and Key Soap Concert Party.

Education 
In 2017 she graduated from the University of Ghana with a Bachelor's degree in Fine Arts.

Career 
She is known for her feature in the local TV series Efiewura.

Personal life 
She dated the late Bob Santo for six years.

Filmography 

 Efiewura

Theater 

 Key Soap Concert Party

References 

Living people
Ghanaian actresses
Year of birth missing (living people)
University of Ghana alumni